Vera Shitjeni (born 21 March 1974) is member of the Central Election Commission of Albania for the Democratic Party of Albania.

References

Living people
1974 births
People from Shkodër